Admiral Sir Alexander Edward Bethell  (28 August 1855 – 13 June 1932) was a British naval officer who served as Commander-in-Chief, Plymouth of the Royal Navy.

Naval career
Born the second son of Richard Augustus Bethell, 2nd Baron Westbury, Bethell joined the Royal Navy in 1869. In July–August 1899 he commanded the Arethusa, which was commissioned for the annual manoeuvres. He was given command of the cruiser HMS Naiad serving in the Mediterranean Fleet in March 1901, and landed the Somaliland Field Force in East Africa before returning to the United Kingdom to become assistant director of torpedoes. He was given command of the battleship HMS Hindustan in 1908. He was appointed Director of Naval Intelligence in 1909.

In that capacity he attended the famous CID meeting on 23 August, at which the government rejected the Royal Navy's proposal that 5 divisions guard Britain whilst one land on the Baltic coast in the event of war with Germany. Instead the Army's plan, to send an Expeditionary Force of between four and six divisions to France, was adopted. He was appointed Commander-in-Chief, East Indies Station in 1912. He was appointed Officer Commanding the Royal Navy War College at Portsmouth in 1913.

He served in World War I as Commander, Battleships for the 3rd Fleet. He was President of the Royal Naval College, Greenwich, from 1914 to 1915 and was appointed Commander-in-Chief, Plymouth, in 1916 and Admiral commanding the Coastguards and Reserves in 1918. He retired later that year.

He lived at Wadeford House in Combe St Nicholas in Somerset. He died in a London nursing home on 13 June 1932.

Family
In 1890 he married Hilda Huntsman; they had two sons and a daughter. Both his sons were killed in World War I.

References

Books

External links
The Dreadnought Project - Alexander Bethell

|-

|-

|-

1855 births
1932 deaths
Royal Navy admirals
Royal Navy admirals of World War I
Knights Grand Cross of the Order of St Michael and St George
Knights Commander of the Order of the Bath
Directors of Naval Intelligence
Admiral presidents of the Royal Naval College, Greenwich
Younger sons of barons
Military personnel from London